Giulio Questi (18 March 1924 – 3 December 2014) was an Italian film director and screenwriter.

Questi was born in Bergamo.  He wrote short stories and filmed several documentaries before he started as assistant director and script writer in the movie business.

He is best known for the films La morte ha fatto l'uovo and Django Kill! (If You Live Shoot!).

Questi died in Rome, aged 90.

Filmography

References

Footnotes

Sources

External links 
 

1924 births
2014 deaths
Film people from Bergamo
Italian screenwriters
Italian male screenwriters
Italian film directors